The 1932 season was Wisła Krakóws 24th year as a club.

Friendlies

Ekstraklasa

Squad, appearances and goals

|-
|}

Goalscorers

Disciplinary record

External links
1932 Wisła Kraków season at historiawisly.pl

Wisła Kraków seasons
Association football clubs 1932 season
Wisla